The Panguna mine is a large copper mine located in the Autonomous Region of Bougainville, in the east of Papua New Guinea. Panguna represents one of the largest copper reserves in Papua New Guinea and in the world, having an estimated reserve of one billion tonnes of ore copper and twelve million ounces of gold. The mine has been closed since 1989 and has ceased all production.

History
The discovery of vast copper ore deposits in Bougainville's Crown Prince Range led to the establishment of the copper mine in 1969 by Bougainville Copper Ltd, a subsidiary of the Australian company Conzinc Rio Tinto of Australia. The mine began production in 1972, with the support of the Papua New Guinea National Government as a 20% shareholder. In contrast to this, the Bougainvilleans received 0.5–1.25% share of the total profit. The site was at the time the world's largest open-pit copper/gold mine, generating 12% of PNG's GDP and over 45% of the nation's export revenue.

The mine caused devastating environmental issues on the island, and the company was responsible for poisoning the entire length of the Jaba River, causing birth defects, as well as the extinction of the flying fox on the island. Bougainville Copper had set up a system of racial segregation on the island, with one set of facilities for white workers and one set for locals. This led to an uprising in 1988, led by Francis Ona, a Panguna landowner and commander of the Bougainville Revolutionary Army. The outcome of the uprising was the Bougainville conflict, between the BRA, who sought secession from PNG, and the Papua New Guinea Defence Force. The ten-year conflict resulted in over 20,000 deaths, as well as the eventual closure of the mine on 15 May 1989, and the complete withdrawal of BCL personnel by 24 March 1990. It has remained closed to this day.

Gallery

See also

 History of Bougainville

References

Copper mines in Papua New Guinea
Former Rio Tinto (corporation) subsidiaries
Open-pit mines